Shin Mi-Hwa (born  in Geochang County) is a South Korean bobsledder.

Shin competed at the 2014 Winter Olympics for South Korea. She teamed with Kim Sun-ok in the two-woman event, finishing 18th.

Shin made her World Cup debut in December 2013. As of April 2014, her best World Cup finish is 20th, at a pair of events in 2013-14.

References

1994 births
Living people
South Korean female bobsledders
Olympic bobsledders of South Korea
Sportspeople from South Gyeongsang Province
Bobsledders at the 2014 Winter Olympics